Puerto Madryn, also known as Madryn, is a city in the province of Chubut in Argentine Patagonia. It is the capital of the Viedma Department, and has about 93,995 inhabitants according to the last census in 2010.

Puerto Madryn is protected by the Golfo Nuevo, which is formed by the Península Valdés and the Punta Ninfas. It is an important centre for tourists visiting the natural attractions of the Península Valdés and the coast.

A new shopping mall in the city centre has helped tourism significantly, making Puerto Madryn a more attractive place for both international and domestic tourists visiting Patagonia. It is twinned with Nefyn, a small town on the Llŷn Peninsula in North Wales, the result of its enduring link with Welsh culture since the Welsh settlement in Argentina. The first of a two-Test tour to Argentina by the Wales national rugby union team was played in 2006 in Puerto Madryn, a 27–25 win for Argentina. Puerto Madryn is home to two football clubs; Club Social y Atlético Guillermo Brown, who play in Nacional B and Deportivo Madryn that currently play in Torneo Argentino B.

A basketball team, Deportivo Puerto Madryn, plays in the Liga Nacional de Básquetbol (LNB). Their home arena is known as the Deportivo Puerto Madryn Arena.

El Tehuelche Airport is located 10 km (6 miles) northwest of the city centre. Commercial flights from Buenos Aires, Ushuaia, and other Argentinian cities are available. Most tourists fly into Trelew Airport as flights into Puerto Madryn are restricted as a result of environmental concerns.

Geography and climate
Puerto Madryn is situated in Chubut on the Golfo Nuevo, which is formed by the Valdés Peninsula and Punta Ninfas. Puerto Madryn features a cold desert climate (Köppen BWk), with an annual precipitation of between 150 and 200 mm (6" to 8").

History
The town was founded on 28 July 1865, when 150 Welsh immigrants arriving aboard the clipper Mimosa named the natural port Porth Madryn in honour of Sir Love Jones-Parry, whose estate in Wales was called Madryn after the Welsh name for Saint Materiana. Conditions were difficult and the settlers had to dig irrigation ditches for their first crops.

The settlement grew as a result of the building of the Central Chubut Railway by Welsh, Spanish, and Italian immigrants. This line, opened in 1889, linked the town to Trelew via the lower Chubut River valley.

Puerto Madryn was the port to which Argentine prisoners of war captured in the Falklands Islands during the 1982 war were repatriated on the vessels SS Canberra and MV Norland, which sailed from Port Stanley on 18 June 1982.

Twin towns 

  Puerto Montt, Chile
  Paola, Italy
  Nefyn, Wales, United Kingdom
  Pisco, Peru
  Ciudad del Carmen, Mexico

See also

 Immigration in Argentina
 Hospital A R Isola

Gallery

Notes

References

External links

 Project-Hiraeth – Documents the stories of the Welsh colony in Patagonia, Argentina through film, text and illustration.
 
 Official website

Populated coastal places in Argentina
Populated places established in 1865
Populated places in Chubut Province
Port settlements in Argentina
Welsh settlement in Patagonia
Cities in Argentina
Argentina